Bashay Feleke (1917 – February 2008) was an Ethiopian long-distance runner. He competed in the marathon at the 1956 Summer Olympics.

References

External links
 

1917 births
2008 deaths
Athletes (track and field) at the 1956 Summer Olympics
Ethiopian male long-distance runners
Ethiopian male marathon runners
Olympic athletes of Ethiopia
Place of birth missing
20th-century Ethiopian people
21st-century Ethiopian people